The Upper West Side (UWS) is a neighborhood in the borough of Manhattan in New York City. It is bounded by Central Park on the east, the Hudson River on the west, West 59th Street to the south, and West 110th Street to the north. The Upper West Side is adjacent to the neighborhoods of Hell's Kitchen to the south, Columbus Circle to the southeast, and Morningside Heights to the north.

Like the Upper East Side opposite Central Park, the Upper West Side is an affluent, primarily residential area with many of its residents working in commercial areas of Midtown and Lower Manhattan. Similarly to the Museum Mile district on the Upper East Side, the Upper West Side is considered one of Manhattan's cultural and intellectual hubs, with Columbia University and Barnard College located just to the north of the neighborhood, the American Museum of Natural History located near its center, and Lincoln Center for the Performing Arts and Fiorello H. LaGuardia High School located at the south end.

The Upper West Side is part of Manhattan Community District 7, and its primary ZIP Codes are 10023, 10024, 10025, and 10069. It is patrolled by the 20th and 24th Precincts of the New York City Police Department.

Geography

The Upper West Side is bounded on the south by 59th Street, Central Park to the east, the Hudson River to the west, and 110th Street to the north. The area north of West 96th Street and east of Broadway is also identified as Manhattan Valley. The overlapping area west of Amsterdam Avenue to Riverside Park was once known as the Bloomingdale District.

From west to east, the avenues of the Upper West Side are Riverside Drive, West End Avenue (11th Avenue), Broadway, Amsterdam Avenue (10th Avenue), Columbus Avenue (9th Avenue), and Central Park West (8th Avenue). The 66-block stretch of Broadway forms the spine of the neighborhood and runs diagonally north–south across the other avenues at the south end of the neighborhood; above 78th Street Broadway runs north parallel to the other avenues. Broadway enters the neighborhood at its juncture with Central Park West at Columbus Circle (59th Street), crosses Columbus Avenue at Lincoln Square (65th Street), Amsterdam Avenue at Verdi Square (71st Street), and then merges with West End Avenue at Straus Park (aka Bloomingdale Square, at 107th Street).

Traditionally the neighborhood ranged from the former village of Harsenville, centered on the old Bloomingdale Road (now Broadway) and 65th Street, west to the railroad yards along the Hudson, then north to 110th Street, where the ground rises to Morningside Heights. With the construction of Lincoln Center, its name, though perhaps not the reality, was stretched south to 58th Street. With the arrival of the corporate headquarters and expensive condos of the Time Warner Center at Columbus Circle, and the Riverside South apartment complex built by Donald Trump, the area from 58th Street to 65th Street is increasingly referred to as Lincoln Square by realtors who acknowledge a different tone and ambiance than that typically associated with the Upper West Side. This is a reversion to the neighborhood's historical name.

History

Native American and colonial use

The long high bluff above useful sandy coves along the North River was little used or traversed by the Lenape people. A combination of the stream valleys, such as that in which 96th Street runs, and wetlands to the northeast and east, may have protected a portion of the Upper West Side from the Lenape's controlled burns; lack of periodic ground fires results in a denser understory and more fire-intolerant trees, such as American Beech.

In the eighteenth and early nineteenth century, the Upper West Side-to-be contained some of colonial New York's most ambitious houses, spaced along Bloomingdale Road. It became increasingly infilled with smaller, more suburban villas in the first half of the nineteenth century, and in the middle of the century, parts had become decidedly lower class.

Bloomingdale District
The name "Bloomingdale District" was used to refer to a part of the Upper West Side – the present-day Manhattan Valley neighborhood – located between 96th and 110th Streets and bounded on the east by Amsterdam Avenue and on the west by Riverside Drive, Riverside Park, and the Hudson River.

Its name was a derivation of the description given to the area by Dutch settlers to New Netherland, likely from Bloemendaal, a town in the tulip region. The name was Anglicized to "Bloomingdale" or "the Bloomingdale District", covering the west side of Manhattan from about 23rd Street up to the Hollow Way (modern 125th Street). It consisted of farms and villages along a road (regularized in 1703) known as the Bloomingdale Road. Bloomingdale Road was renamed The Boulevard in 1868, as the farms and villages were divided into building lots and absorbed into the city. By the 18th century it contained numerous farms and country residences of many of the city's well-off, a major parcel of which was the Apthorp Farm. The main artery of this area was the Bloomingdale Road, which began north of where Broadway and the Bowery Lane (now Fourth Avenue) join (at modern Union Square) and wended its way northward up to about modern 116th Street in Morningside Heights, where the road further north was known as the Kingsbridge Road. Within the confines of the modern-day Upper West Side, the road passed through areas known as Harsenville, Strycker's Bay, and Bloomingdale Village.

With the building of the Croton Aqueduct passing down the area between present day Amsterdam Avenue and Columbus Avenue in 1838–42, the northern reaches of the district became divided into Manhattan Valley to the east of the aqueduct and Bloomingdale to the west. Bloomingdale, in the latter half of the 19th century, was the name of a village that occupied the area just south of 110th street.

Late 19th-century development

Much of the riverfront of the Upper West Side was a shipping, transportation, and manufacturing corridor. The Hudson River Railroad line right-of-way was granted in the late 1830s to connect New York City to Albany, and soon ran along the riverbank. One major non-industrial development, the creation of Central Park in the 1850s and '60s, caused many squatters to move their shacks into the Upper West Side. Parts of the neighborhood became a ragtag collection of squatters' housing, boarding houses, and rowdy taverns.

As this development occurred, the old name of Bloomingdale Road was being chopped away and the name Broadway was progressively applied further northward to include what had been lower Bloomingdale Road. In 1868, the city began straightening and grading the section of the Bloomingdale Road from Harsenville north, and it became known as "Western Boulevard" or "The Boulevard". It retained that name until the end of the century, when the name Broadway finally supplanted it.

Development of the neighborhood lagged even while Central Park was being laid out in the 1860s and '70s, then was stymied by the Panic of 1873. Things turned around with the introduction of the Ninth Avenue elevated in the 1870s along Ninth Avenue (renamed Columbus Avenue in 1890), and with Columbia University's relocation to Morningside Heights in the 1890s, using lands once held by the Bloomingdale Insane Asylum.

Riverside Park was conceived in 1866 and formally approved by the state legislature through the efforts of city parks commissioner Andrew Haswell Green. The first segment of park was acquired through condemnation in 1872, and construction soon began following a design created by the firm of Frederick Law Olmsted, who also designed the adjacent, gracefully curving Riverside Drive. In 1937, under the administration of commissioner Robert Moses,  of land were added to the park, primarily by creating a promenade that covered the tracks of the Hudson River Railroad. Moses, working with landscape architect Gilmore D. Clarke also added playgrounds, and distinctive stonework and the 79th Street Boat Basin, but also cut pedestrians off from direct access to most of the riverfront by building the Henry Hudson Parkway by the river's edge. According to Robert Caro's book on Moses, The Power Broker, Riverside Park was designed with most of the amenities located in predominantly white neighborhoods, with the neighborhoods closer to Harlem getting shorter shrift. Riverside Park, like Central Park, underwent a revival late in the 20th century, largely through the efforts of the Riverside Park Fund, a citizen's group. Largely through their efforts and the support of the city, much of the park has been improved. The Hudson River Greenway along the river-edge of the park is a common route for pedestrians and bicyclists; an extension to the park's greenway runs between 83rd and 91st Streets on a promenade in the river itself.

Early 20th century

Subway expansion

1868 saw the opening of the now demolished IRT Ninth Avenue Line – the city's first elevated railway – which opened in the decade following the American Civil War.  The Upper West Side experienced a building boom from 1885 to 1910, thanks in large part to the 1904 opening of the city's first subway line, which comprised, in part, what is now a portion of the IRT Broadway–Seventh Avenue Line, with subway stations at 59th, 66th, 72nd, 79th, 86th, 91st, 96th, 103rd, 110th, 116th, and 125th Streets.

This further stimulated residential development of the area. The stately tall apartment blocks on West End Avenue and the townhouses on the streets between Amsterdam Avenue and Riverside Drive, which contribute to the character of the area, were all constructed during the pre-depression years of the twentieth century. A revolution in building techniques, the low cost of land relative to lower Manhattan, the arrival of the subway, and the popularization of the formerly expensive elevator made it possible to construct large apartment buildings for the middle classes. The large scale and style of these buildings is one reason why the neighborhood has remained largely unchanged into the twenty-first century.

The neighborhood changed from the 1930s to the 1950s. In 1932, the IND Eighth Avenue Line opened under Central Park West. In 1940, the elevated IRT Ninth Avenue Line over Columbus Avenue closed. Immigrants from Eastern Europe and the Caribbean moved in during the '50s and the '60s. The Lincoln Center for the Performing Arts opened in the 1960s.

Enclaves

In the 1900s, the area south of 67th Street was heavily populated by African-Americans and supposedly gained its nickname of "San Juan Hill" in commemoration of African-American soldiers who were a major part of  Theodore Roosevelt's assault on Cuba's San Juan Hill in the Spanish–American War. By 1960, it was a rough neighborhood of tenement housing, the demolition of which was delayed to allow for exterior shots in the film musical West Side Story. Thereafter, urban renewal brought the construction of the Lincoln Center for the Performing Arts and Lincoln Towers apartments during 1962–1968.

The Upper West Side is a significant Jewish neighborhood, populated with both German Jews who moved in at the turn of last century, and Jewish refugees escaping Hitler's Europe in the 1930s. Today the area between 85th Street and 100th Street is home to the largest community of young Modern Orthodox singles outside of Israel. However, the Upper West Side also features a substantial number of non-Orthodox Jews. A number of major synagogues are located in the neighborhood, including the oldest Jewish congregation in the United States, Shearith Israel; New York's second-oldest and the third-oldest Ashkenazi synagogue, B'nai Jeshurun; Rodeph Sholom; the Stephen Wise Free Synagogue; and numerous others.

Late 20th-century urban renewal

From the post-WWII years until the AIDS epidemic, the neighborhood, especially below 86th Street, had a substantial gay population. As the neighborhood had deteriorated, it was affordable to working class gay men, and those just arriving in the city and looking for their first white collar jobs. Its ethnically mixed gay population, mostly Hispanic and white, with a mixture of income levels and occupations patronized the same gay bars in the neighborhood, making it markedly different from most gay enclaves elsewhere in the city. The influx of white gay men in the Fifties and Sixties is often credited with accelerating the gentrification of the Upper West Side.

In a subsequent phase of urban renewal, the rail yards which had formed the Upper West Side's southwest corner were replaced by the Riverside South residential project, which included a southward extension of Riverside Park. The evolution of Riverside South had a 40-year history, often extremely bitter, beginning in 1962 when the New York Central Railroad, in partnership with the Amalgamated Lithographers Union, proposed a mixed-use development with 12,000 apartments, Litho City, to be built on platforms over the tracks. The subsequent bankruptcy of the enlarged, but short-lived Penn Central Railroad brought other proposals and prospective developers. The one generating the most opposition was Donald Trump's "Television City" concept of 1985, which would have included a 152-story office tower and six 75-story residential buildings. In 1991, a coalition of prominent civic organizations proposed a purely residential development of about half that size, and then reached a deal with Trump.

The community's links to the events of September 11, 2001 were evinced in Upper West Side resident and Pulitzer Prize winner David Halberstam's paean to the men of Ladder Co 40/Engine Co 35, just a few blocks from his home, in his book Firehouse.

Today, this area is the site for several long-established charitable institutions; their unbroken parcels of land have provided suitably scaled sites for Columbia University and the Cathedral of Saint John the Divine, as well as for some vanished landmarks, such as the Schwab Mansion on Riverside Drive.

The name Bloomingdale is still used in reference to a part of the Upper West Side, essentially the location of old Bloomingdale Village, the area from about 96th Street up to 110th Street and from Riverside Park east to Amsterdam Avenue. The triangular block bound by Broadway, West End Avenue, 106th Street and 107th Street, although generally known as Straus Park (named for Isidor Straus and his wife Ida), was officially designated Bloomingdale Square in 1907. The neighborhood also includes the Bloomingdale School of Music and Bloomingdale neighborhood branch of the New York Public Library. Adjacent to the Bloomingdale neighborhood is a more diverse and less affluent subsection of the Upper West Side called Manhattan Valley, focused on the downslope of Columbus Avenue and Manhattan Avenue from about 96th Street up to 110th Street.

Demographics

For census purposes, the New York City government classifies the Upper West Side as part of two neighborhood tabulation areas: Upper West Side (up to 105th Street) and Lincoln Square (down to 58th Street), divided by 74th Street. Based on data from the 2010 United States Census, the combined population of the Upper West Side was 193,867, a change of 1,674 (0.9%) from the 192,193 counted in 2000. The racial makeup of the neighborhood was 69.5% (134,735) White, 7.1% (13,856) African American, 0.1% (194) Native American, 7.6% (14,804) Asian, 0% (48) Pacific Islander, 0.3% (620) from other races, and 2% (3,828) from two or more races. Hispanic or Latino of any race were 13.3% (25,782) of the population.

The racial composition of the Upper West Side changed moderately from 2000 to 2010, with the greatest changes being the increase in the Asian population by 38% (4,100), the decrease in the Black population by 15% (2,435), and the increase in the Hispanic / Latino population by 8% (2,147). The White population remained the majority, experiencing a slight increase of 2% (2,098), while the small population of all other races experienced a negligible increase of 1% (58). Taking into account the two census tabulation areas, the overall decreases in the Black and Hispanic / Latino populations were concentrated in the Upper West Side area, with the Hispanic / Latino population actually increasing by a smaller margin in Lincoln Square. On the other hand, the increases in the White and Asian populations were mostly in Lincoln Center, especially the White population.

The entirety of Community District 7, which comprises the Upper West Side from 59th Street to 110th Street, had 214,744 inhabitants as of NYC Health's 2018 Community Health Profile, with an average life expectancy of 84.7 years. This is higher than the median life expectancy of 81.2 for all New York City neighborhoods. Most residents are adults: a plurality (34%) are between the ages of 25–44, while 27% are between 45 and 64, and 18% are 65 or older. The ratio of youth and college-aged residents was lower, at 15% and 5% respectively.

As of 2017, the median household income in Community District 7 was $123,894. In 2018, an estimated 9% of Upper West Side residents lived in poverty, compared to 14% in all of Manhattan and 20% in all of New York City. One in twenty residents (5%) were unemployed, compared to 7% in Manhattan and 9% in New York City. Rent burden, or the percentage of residents who have difficulty paying their rent, is 40% in the Upper West Side, compared to the boroughwide and citywide rates of 45% and 51% respectively. Based on this calculation, Community District 7 is not considered to be gentrifying: according to the Community Health Profile, the district was not low-income in 1990.

Political representation 

The Upper West Side is part of Manhattan Community District 7. Politically, the Upper West Side is in New York's 10th congressional district. It is in the New York State Senate's 27th, 29th, 30th, and 31st districts, the New York State Assembly's 67th, 69th, and 75th districts, and the New York City Council's 6th, 8th, and 9th districts.

Notable structures

Organization headquarters
 American Broadcasting Company – KPF-designed headquarters located at 77 West 66th Street at Columbus Avenue.
 Time Warner – Skidmore, Owings & Merrill-designed headquarters located on Columbus Circle, at the site of the old New York Coliseum.
 Two primary music licensing organizations are located in the neighborhood, ASCAP and BMI.
 Lighthouse Guild – This non-sectarian, non-profit organization serving the visually impaired, blind, and those with multiple disabilities, has its national headquarters on West 64th Street between Amsterdam and West End Avenues.

Cultural institutions
 American Folk Art Museum
 Eva and Morris Feld Gallery
 American Museum of Natural History
 Hayden Planetarium
 Ballet Hispanico Tina Ramirez
 Bach Vespers at Holy Trinity
 Bard Graduate Center Gallery
 Beacon Theatre
 Children's Museum of Manhattan
 Lincoln Center – A total of 12 performing arts companies hosted in a variety of theater and recital spaces
 Metropolitan Opera
 David Geffen Hall (formerly Avery Fisher Hall), home of the New York Philharmonic
 David H. Koch Theater (formerly New York State Theater), home of the New York City Ballet
 Juilliard School of Music
 Jazz at Lincoln Center
 Alice Tully Hall
 Film Society of Lincoln Center
 School of American Ballet
 Vivian Beaumont Theater
 Claire Tow Theater 
 Mitzi Newhouse Theater
 Damrosch Park
 New York Public Library for the Performing Arts
 Bruno Walter Auditorium
 Museum of Biblical Art
 Merkin Concert Hall
 New-York Historical Society
 Nicholas Roerich Museum
 Symphony Space
 Thalia Theater
 El Taller Latinoamericano

Other historical sites

 American Youth Hostel – the transformation of this abandoned Richard Morris Hunt landmark into the flagship of Hostelling International USA was propelled forward by the federal Community Development Block Grant funded, Manhattan Valley Neighborhood Strategy Area designation.
 Apple Bank – formerly Central Savings Bank, a Florentine palazzo at Broadway and 73rd, with a Roman banking hall, one of New York's classic interior spaces, York & Sawyer, architects, ironwork by Samuel Yellin, 1928. The upper floors have been converted to luxury condominium apartments.
 Claremont Riding Academy – In 2007, after 115 years of use, the last public stables in Manhattan, this National Register building on 89th Street, just east of Amsterdam, closed its doors for good. The subsequent interior gutting for conversion to residential use has halted.
 Columbus Circle – Traffic circle at the intersection of Broadway, Central Park West and Eighth Avenue, and Central Park South. Its centerpiece is a statue of the explorer Christopher Columbus erected in 1906. Two other similarly financed monuments on Broadway include those to writer Dante Aligheri in Dante Park between 63rd and 64th Streets at Columbus Avenue (which now heralds Lincoln Center); and to composer Giuseppe Verdi which anchors Verdi Square, girded by 72nd and 73rd Streets at Amsterdam Avenue. The square, which actually was a triangle, was expanded to allow for a new subway head house and a plaza which became the setting for summer concerts. The aforementioned Apple Bank is across from the statue, and the Ansonia Hotel lies diagonally across the northwest intersection.
 The Dakota is a co-op apartment building on 72nd Street and Central Park West where musician John Lennon was murdered in 1980.
 The former East River Savings Bank at Amsterdam and 96th Street (Walker & Gillette, 1927) is a classical temple now housing a drugstore, locally termed "The Aspirineum" and "The First National Bank of CVS"
 Firemen's Memorial – this 1913 monument on Riverside Drive at 100th Street has been the scene of somber gatherings and spontaneous gestures, such as a display of flowers and children's teddy bears on 9/11. The Piccirilli Brothers' female model for this work, Audrey Munson, sat for the nearby Straus Memorial and for their Maine Monument, as well.
 Grant's Tomb – in Morningside Heights
 Joan of Arc Monument – a monument to the 15th-century French heroine bestrides a horse on a crest of Riverside Drive at 93rd Street.
 Soldiers' & Sailors' Monument – this Civil War memorial dominating Riverside Drive at 89th Street, is the setting for annual Memorial Day commemorations.
 Isidor and Ida Straus Memorial – honors Isidor Straus, co-owner of Macy's, and his wife, who lived in a mansion on West End Avenue and 105th Street, and died on the RMS Titanic, in triangular Straus Park at Broadway, West End Avenue and West 106th Street. The model for the sculpture was also the muse for the Maine Monument, 57 blocks south on Broadway, at the Columbus Circle entrance to Central Park.
The 69th street Halloween celebration.
 General Franz Sigel Monument- a patriot both in his native land of Germany and in the United States. During later years in life, Franz Sigel became a dedicated educator for public and German schools, while residing in New York City. Located at 341 Riverside Dr, New York, NY 10025.

Residences

The apartment buildings along Central Park West, facing the park, are some of the city's most opulent. The Dakota at 72nd St. has been home to numerous celebrities including John Lennon, Leonard Bernstein and Lauren Bacall. Other buildings on CPW include the Art Deco Century Apartments (Irwin Chanin, 1931), and The Majestic, also by Chanin. The San Remo, The El Dorado and The Beresford were all designed by Emery Roth, as was 41 West 96th Street (completed in 1926). The Alden, a sister hotel to The Beresford, was also designed by Roth. His first commission, the Belle Époque Belleclaire, is on Broadway, while the moderne Normandie holds forth on Riverside at 86th Street. Along Broadway are several Beaux-Arts apartment houses: The Belnord (1908) – the fronting block of which was co-named in honor of longtime resident I.B. Singer, plus The Apthorp (1908), The Ansonia (1902), The Dorilton and the  Manhasset. All are individually designated New York City landmarks.

The serpentine Riverside Drive also has many pre-war houses and larger buildings, while West End Avenue is lined with pre-war Beaux-Arts apartment buildings and townhouses dating from the late-19th and early 20th centuries. Columbus Avenue north of 87th Street was the spine for major post-World War II urban renewal. Broadway is lined with such architecturally notable apartment buildings as The Ansonia, The Apthorp, The Belnord, the Astor Court Building, and The Cornwall, which features an Art Nouveau cornice. Newly constructed 15 Central Park West and 535 West End Avenue are among some of the prestigious residential addresses in Manhattan.

Restaurants and gourmet groceries

Both Broadway and Amsterdam Avenue from 67th Street up to 110th Street are lined with restaurants and bars, as is Columbus Avenue to a slightly lesser extent. The following lists a few prominent ones:
 Barney Greengrass, specializing in fish at Amsterdam Avenue and 86th Street; featured in the 2011 film Extremely Loud & Incredibly Close. It marked its centenary in June 2008.
 The Howard Chandler Christie murals of Café des Artistes, a now-closed French restaurant on West 67th Street off Central Park West, are being incorporated into a new restaurant on the site.
 Cafe Lalo,  dessert and coffee venue at 83rd Street and Amsterdam Avenue, opened in 1988 and featured in the 1998 movie You've Got Mail.
 Community Food and Juice, an eco-conscious restaurant at 2893 Broadway between 112th and 113th Streets.
 A branch of Gray's Papaya, which specializes in hot dogs, is located at Broadway and 72nd Street.
 The original Zabar's is a specialty food and housewares store at Broadway and 80th Street.
 Levana's, a kosher, fine dining restaurant was part of the neighborhood for three decades, but closed in the 2000s.

Police and crime
The Upper West Side is patrolled by two precincts of the NYPD. The 20th Precinct is located at 120 West 82nd Street and serves the part of the neighborhood south of 86th Street, while the 24th Precinct is located at 151 West 100th Street and serves the part of the neighborhood north of 86th Street.

The 20th Precinct has a lower crime rate than in the 1990s, with crimes across all categories having decreased by 85.8% between 1990 and 2019. The precinct reported 1 murder, 10 rapes, 85 robberies, 80 felony assaults, 81 burglaries, 605 grand larcenies, and 38 grand larcenies auto in 2019. Of the five major violent felonies (murder, rape, felony assault, robbery, and burglary), the 20th Precinct had a rate of 250 crimes per 100,000 residents in 2019, compared to the boroughwide average of 632 crimes per 100,000 and the citywide average of 572 crimes per 100,000.

The 24th Precinct also has a lower crime rate than in the 1990s, with crimes across all categories having decreased by 82.0% between 1990 and 2019. The precinct reported 2 murders, 10 rapes, 172 robberies, 147 felony assaults, 109 burglaries, 538 grand larcenies, and 39 grand larcenies auto in 2019. Of the five major violent felonies (murder, rape, felony assault, robbery, and burglary), the 24th Precinct had a rate of 414 crimes per 100,000 residents in 2019, compared to the boroughwide average of 632 crimes per 100,000 and the citywide average of 572 crimes per 100,000.

, Manhattan Community District 7 has a non-fatal assault hospitalization rate of 25 per 100,000 people, compared to the boroughwide rate of 49 per 100,000 and the citywide rate of 59 per 100,000. Its incarceration rate is 211 per 100,000 people, compared to the boroughwide rate of 407 per 100,000 and the citywide rate of 425 per 100,000.

In 2019, the highest concentration of felony assaults and robberies in the Upper West Side was on Columbus Avenue between 100th Street and 104th Street (going through the Frederick Douglass Houses), where there were 24 felony assaults and 15 robberies. The area around the intersection of 72nd Street and Broadway also had 14 robberies in 2019.

Fire safety
The Upper West Side is served by multiple New York City Fire Department (FDNY) fire stations:
 Engine Company 40/Ladder Company 35 – 131 Amsterdam Avenue 
 Ladder Company 25/Division 3/Collapse Rescue 1 – 205 West 77th Street 
 Engine Company 74 – 120 West 83rd Street 
 Engine Company 76/Ladder Company 22/Battalion 11 – 145 West 100th Street

Health
, preterm births and births to teenage mothers in the Upper West Side are lower than the city average. In the Upper West Side, there were 78 preterm births per 1,000 live births (compared to 87 per 1,000 citywide), and 7.1 births to teenage mothers per 1,000 live births (compared to 19.3 per 1,000 citywide). The Upper West Side has a low population of residents who are uninsured. In 2018, this population of uninsured residents was estimated to be 5%, less than the citywide rate of 12%, though this was based on a small sample size.

Ten percent of Upper West Side residents are smokers, which is less than the city average of 14% of residents being smokers. In the Upper West Side, 10% of residents are obese, 5% are diabetic, and 21% have high blood pressure—compared to the citywide averages of 24%, 11%, and 28% respectively. In addition, 10% of children are obese, compared to the citywide average of 20%.

Ninety-two percent of residents eat some fruits and vegetables every day, which is higher than the city's average of 87%. In 2018, 93% of residents described their health as "good," "very good," or "excellent," the highest rate in the city and more than the city's average of 78%. For every supermarket in the Upper West Side, there are 3 bodegas.

Mount Sinai Urgent Care Upper West Side is located in the Upper West Side.

Post offices and ZIP Codes
Upper West Side is located in three primary ZIP Codes. From south to north, they are 10023 south of 76th Street, 10024 between 76th and 91st Streets, and 10025 north of 91st Street. In addition, Riverside South is part of 10069.  The United States Postal Service operates five post offices in the Upper West Side:
 Ansonia Station – 178 Columbus Avenue
 Cathedral Station – 215 West 104th Street
 Columbus Circle Station – 27 West 60th Street
 Park West Station – 700 Columbus Avenue
 Planetarium Station – 127 West 83rd Street

Education 

The Upper West Side generally has a higher rate of college-educated residents than the rest of the city . A majority of residents age 25 and older (78%) have a college education or higher, while 6% have less than a high school education and 16% are high school graduates or have some college education. By contrast, 64% of Manhattan residents and 43% of city residents have a college education or higher. The percentage of the Upper West Side students excelling in math rose from 35% in 2000 to 66% in 2011, and reading achievement increased from 43% to 56% during the same time period.

The Upper West Side's rate of elementary school student absenteeism is lower than the rest of New York City. In the Upper West Side, 14% of elementary school students missed twenty or more days per school year, less than the citywide average of 20%. Additionally, 83% of high school students in the Upper West Side graduate on time, more than the citywide average of 75%.

Schools

Public
The New York City Department of Education operates the following public elementary schools in the Upper West Side:

 PS 9 Sarah Anderson (grades PK-5)
 PS 75 Emily Dickinson (grades K-5)
 PS 84 Lilian Weber (grades PK-5)
 PS 87 William Sherman (grades PK-5)
 PS 145 The Bloomingdale School (grades PK-5)
 PS 163 Alfred E Smith (grades PK-5)
 PS 165 Robert E Simon (grades PK-8)
 PS 166 The Richard Rogers School of the Arts and Technology (grades K-5)
 PS 191 The Riverside School for Makers and Artists (grades PK-8)
 PS 199 Jessie Isador Straus (grades K-5)
 PS 212 Midtown West (grades PK-5)
 PS 333 Manhattan School For Children (grades K-8)
 PS 452 (grades PK-5)
 PS 811 Mickey Mantle School (grades PK-9)
 Special Music School (grades K-12)
 The Anderson School (grades K-8)

The following public middle schools serves grades 6-8 unless otherwise indicated:

 JHS 54 Booker T Washington
 Mott Hall II
 MS 243 Center School (grades 5–8)
 MS 245 The Computer School
 MS 247 Dual Language Middle School
 MS 250 West Side Collaborative Middle School
 MS 256 Lafayette Academy
 MS 258 Community Action School
 West Prep Academy

The following public high schools serve grades 9-12 unless otherwise indicated:
 Edward A. Reynolds West Side High School
 Fiorello H. LaGuardia High School – a specialized high school
 Martin Luther King Jr. Educational Campus
 High School for Arts Imagination and Inquiry
 High School for Law Advocacy and Community Justice
 High School of Arts and Technology
 Manhattan/Hunter Science High School
 Urban Assembly School for Media Studies
 Special Music School High School
 Louis D. Brandeis High School Campus
 Frank McCourt High School
 Innovation Diploma Plus (grades 10–12)
 The Global Learning Collaborative
 Urban Assembly School for Green Careers

Charter and private
The following charter and private schools are located in the Upper West Side:

 Abraham Joshua Heschel School
 Lower and Middle Schools – West End Avenue at West 61st Street
 High School – West End Avenue at West 60th Street
 Alexander Robertson School – West 95th Street off Central Park West
 Ascension School – (Pre-K3 through 8), 220 West 108th Street (between Broadway and Amsterdam)
 Bank Street School for Children
 Beit Rabban Day School – an innovative, non-denominational day school combining intellectual rigor, serious Jewish learning, and a progressive educational approach
 Bloomingdale School of Music
 Calhoun School
 Main Building – 433 West End Avenue at 81st Street.
 Robert L. Beir Lower School – 160 West 74th Street, between Amsterdam & Columbus avenues.
 The Center School – 84th street, between Columbus & Amsterdam Avenues
 The Collegiate School – Central Park West and 63rd Street
 Columbia Grammar & Preparatory School
 Columbus Academy
 Dwight School
 Ethical Culture
 La Salle Academy
 Lucy Moses School
 The Mandell School
 Manhattan Day School
 Rodeph Sholom School
 School of the Blessed Sacrament – 140 West 70th Street
 Solomon Schechter School of Manhattan (2–8 West 89th)
 St. Agnes Boys High School
 The Studio School
 Success Academy Upper West
 Trevor Day School (Lower)
 Trinity School
 Twin Parks Montessori Schools
 Central Park Montessori – 1 West 91st Street
 Park West Montessori – 435 Central Park West
 Riverside Montessori – 202 Riverside Drive
 Yeshiva Ketana of Manhattan occupies Herts & Tallent's 1903 Beaux Arts Rice Mansion at 346 West 89th Street and Riverside Drive.
 York Preparatory School – 40 W 68th St

Higher education

 The Richard Gilder Graduate School at American Museum of Natural History – Central Park West & West 79th Street
 The American Musical and Dramatic Academy – 211 W 61st Street, between Amsterdam & West End Avenues.
 Columbia University – in Morningside Heights
 Bank Street College of Education and School for Children – in Morningside Heights
 Bard Graduate Center at 86th and Columbus.
 Barnard College – one of the Seven Sisters in Morningside Heights
 Fordham University Lincoln Center campus – Schools of Law, Business, Social Service and Education
 Jewish Theological Seminary of America – in Morningside Heights
 The Juilliard School
 Lander College for Women, a division of Touro College, West 60th Street between Amsterdam and West End Avenues.
 New York Institute of Technology – in the Columbus Circle proximity
 New York Theological Seminary – in Morningside Heights
 William E. Macaulay Honors College – this collaborative endeavor of CUNY's senior colleges occupies the 92nd St Y's former Makor/Steinhardt Building on West 67th Street, east of Columbus Avenue, the latter having relocated to Tribeca.
 Manhattan School of Music – in Morningside Heights
 Mannes College The New School for Music, a division of The New School, on 85th Street between Amsterdam and Columbus
 Teachers College of Columbia University, in Morningside Heights
 Union Theological Seminary – in Morningside Heights

Libraries

The New York Public Library (NYPL) operates four branches in the Upper West Side, of which three are circulating branches and one is a reference branch.
 The New York Public Library for the Performing Arts (LPA) is a reference branch located at 40 Lincoln Center Plaza. It houses one of the world's largest collections of materials relating to the performing arts. The LPA also contains a circulating collection.
 The Bloomingdale branch is a circulating branch located at 127 East 58th Street. It was founded in 1897 as a New York Free Circulating Library branch and became an NYPL branch in 1901. The Bloomingdale branch moved to its current two-story location in 1961.
 The Riverside branch is a circulating branch located at 127 Amsterdam Avenue (at West 65th St). It was founded in 1897 as a New York Free Circulating Library branch and became an NYPL branch in 1901. The Riverside branch was housed in a Carnegie library building at 190 Amsterdam Avenue from 1904 until 1969, when the structure was replaced. In 1992, it moved to its current two-story space near Lincoln Center.
 The St Agnes branch is a circulating branch located at 444 Amsterdam Avenue (near West 81st St). It was founded in 1893 as the St. Agnes Chapel's parish library and became an NYPL branch in 1901. The current Carnegie library building opened in 1906.

Houses of worship 

 Fourth Universalist Society in the City of New York – known as the "Cathedral of Universalism." Founded in 1838, it is a member of the Unitarian Universalist Association and is located at 76th Street and Central Park West. The current building was designed by William Appleton Potter in 1898 and features stained glass by Clayton and Bell of London, an altar by Louis Tiffany and a relief sculpture by Augustus Saint-Gaudens. Notable parishioners include P.T. Barnum, Horace Greeley, and Louise Carnegie, who donated the church's organ.
 The Church of St. Paul the Apostle – Late Gothic Revival-Style Building at the corner of West 60th Street and Columbus Avenue that is the mother church of the Paulist Fathers. The sanctuary houses a large organ of 4,965 pipes, built by M. P. Moller in 1965.
 Cathedral of Saint John the Divine – in Morningside Heights, the largest Gothic cathedral in the world, or at least it will be, when it's finished. Suffered significant fire damage to the South transept in December 2001. The church was originally to follow a Byzantine-Romanesque design, but the builders switched to a Gothic design along the way. The church plans to replace the great dome with a massive Gothic tower, but this major construction project is likely to take decades, if it is ever completed.
 Redeemer Presbyterian Church – The West Side congregation of Redeemer Presbyterian Church, at 150 West 83rd St., between Amsterdam and Columbus
 First Baptist Church in the City of New York 79th Street at Broadway
 West-Park Presbyterian Church, designed by Leopold Eidlitz
 Christ and Saint Stephen's Church (Episcopal). Built 1880.
 The Church of St. Gregory the Great – Roman Catholic parish and school on West 90th Street between Amsterdam and Columbus avenues. During the Vietnam War, it was the sanctuary for celebrated fugitive priest Philip Berrigan, who with his fellow priest brother Daniel was then one of the FBI's "10 Most Wanted". More recently, Irish author Colm Tóibín wrote of the church's choir.
 United Methodist Church of St. Paul & St. Andrew – West End Avenue and 86th Street. Center of strong community outreach programs to the disaffected.
 Ansche Chesed
 B'nai Jeshurun – In 1825, Ashkenazi members left the city's first Jewish house of worship, the Sephardic Congregation Shearith Israel, beginning a trek up Manhattan that would land them on West 88th Street between West End Avenue and Broadway. The 1919 building designed by Broadway theater architect Henry B. Herts with fellow congregant Walter S. Schneider, became a must see for boards of other synagogues then seeking to build new homes. A spiritual and demographic renaissance began in 1985, with the arrival of Rabbi Marshall Meyer.
 Congregation Habonim – founded by refugees on the first anniversary of the Kristallnacht, this congregation occupies a classic post-World War II suburban style synagogue at 44 West 66th Street just off of Central Park West.
 Congregation Shaare Zedek (New York City) West 93rd Street, between Broadway and Amsterdam.
 Congregation Shearith Israel – oldest Jewish congregation in what is now the United States was launched in 1655. Its landmark, 1897 building on Central Park West at West 70th Street was designed by Arnold Brunner and Thomas Tryon and incorporated elements of its first New Amsterdam sanctuary in its small chapel.
 Congregation Rodeph Sholom 83rd Street/Central Park.
 Holy Name of Jesus R.C. Church – 207 West 96th Street, NW corner of Amsterdam. Built 1892–1900; restored 1998–2000.
 Congregation Ohab Zedek
 Kehilat Orach Eliezer
 Kol Zimrah
 Manhattan New York Temple of the Church of Jesus Christ of Latter-day Saints. 65th Street and Columbus/Broadway, across the street from Lincoln Center.
 National Council of Churches – prime ecumenical tenant of the Interchurch Center, 120th St. and Riverside Drive.
 Riverside Church – in Morningside Heights
 Rutgers Presbyterian Church – "More Light" Presbyterian Congregation just off Verdi Square and 72nd Subway Station on 236 W. 73rd Street
 St. Michael's Traditional Anglican and emerging church/Seeker worship services at Amsterdam Ave and W 99th Street
 St. Ignatius of Antioch Episcopal Church – Excellent example of Anglican "high church" architecture at 87th Street and West End Avenue
 Society for Ethical Culture, also a classical music venue
 Society for the Advancement of Judaism
 Stephen Wise Free Synagogue

Transportation
Two New York City Subway corridors serve the Upper West Side. The IRT Broadway–Seventh Avenue Line runs below Broadway, and the IND Eighth Avenue Line runs below Central Park West.

There are five bus routes –  buses – that go up and down the Upper West Side, and the  goes up West End Avenue for 15 blocks in the neighborhood. The north–south  terminates at Lincoln Center.

In popular culture
The Upper West Side has been a setting for many films and television shows.

Films
In alphabetical order:

 American Psycho (2000) Christian Bale's character (Patrick Bateman) lives at 55 West 81st Street, named as the American Gardens Building.
 The Apartment (1960)
 Black and White (1999), has scenes of Central Park and Columbia University
 Black Swan (2010) The main character, Nina, played by Natalie Portman, states that she lives on Manhattan's upper west side.
 Borat: Cultural Learnings of America for Make Benefit Glorious Nation of Kazakhstan (2006) Early on in his trip to America, Borat is seen in Columbus Circle in front of the Trump International Hotel and Tower
 Death Wish (1974), where the main character, Paul Kersey, played by Charles Bronson, lives in between Riverside Drive and West End Avenue
 Die Hard with a Vengeance (1995), includes a scene set outside the subway station at 72nd Street and Broadway, featuring a public phone that was in fact only a prop.
 Elf (2003), includes a scene when Buddy's brother leaves school (York Prep) at 40 West 68th Street.
 Enchanted (2007), Robert & Morgan live in a building on the corner of Riverside Drive and 116th Street, Robert's office is in the Time Warner Center on Columbus Circle.
 Extremely Loud & Incredibly Close (2011) The Schell family lives at The Gramont, 215 West 98th Street.
 Eyes Wide Shut (1999) The characters played by Tom Cruise and Nicole Kidman live in an apartment on Central Park West.
 Fools Rush In (1997) Several scenes, including the 72nd St. & Broadway Subway station and CPW
 Fatal Attraction (1987) In the film, Michael Douglas' character lives in a building on 100th and West End Avenue
 Ghostbusters (1984) At the opening the title characters shown being ousted professors on the Columbia University campus, and Sigourney Weaver's character lives in 55 Central Park West, at 66th St.
 The Goodbye Girl (1977) Filmed at 170 West 78th Street off Amsterdam Avenue. Starring Richard Dreyfuss and Marsha Mason
 Hannah and Her Sisters (1986) Hannah's parents' apartment is shown on Riverside and 86th Street, and near the end of the film Woody Allen's character is seen walking along Broadway between 92nd and 93rd Streets and then entering the Metro Theatre at Broadway between 99th and 100th Streets.
 Heartburn (1986), finds Meryl Streep's character taking refuge in her father's spacious apartment at the Apthorp on 79th Street and Broadway after her marriage fails; author Nora Ephron, on whose novel the film was based, was an Apthorp resident at the time.
 Home Alone 2: Lost in New York (1992), takes place in Central Park, and in a townhouse on 95th St. as well as other locations throughout New York.
 Hitch (2005), starts with Will Smith's character Hitch, exiting 865 West End Avenue, 102nd Street, apartment building.
 The House on 92nd Street (1945), though set on the Upper East Side at 92nd/Madison, the film is based on the true story of Nazi spies operating out of an Upper West Side boarding house on 90th Street between Amsterdam/Columbus.
 Keeping the Faith (2000), various church and synagogue locations
 Kissing Jessica Stein (2002)
 A Late Quartet (2012), Time Warner Center at Columbus Circle and Central Park
 Little Manhattan (2005)includes scenes from the American Museum of Natural History, Central Park West, Broadway at 72nd Street, and Septuagesimo Uno – the city's smallest public park, located on W. 71st Street between Amsterdam and West End Avenues.
 I Am Legend (2007)featuring Will Smith, the now demolished Red Cross building on 66th and Amsterdam was used for many indoor "zombie" scenes.
 Margaret (2011)featuring Matt Damon, in the opening scene 17-year-old Manhattan student Lisa Cohen, shopping on the Upper West Side, interacts with bus driver Gerald Maretti as she runs alongside his moving bus.
 Men in Black II (2002)featuring Tommy Lee Jones and Will Smith, outside in front of Hayden Planetarium at the American Museum of Natural History.
 The Mirror Has Two Faces (1996)The romantic comedy by Barbra Streisand was set in an apartment at 505 West End Avenue.
 Music and Lyrics (2007)featuring Hugh Grant and Drew Barrymore. The area around 72nd Street which forms the backdrop for Grant's apartment. The restaurant scene was shot at La Fenice at 69th and Broadway.
 New York Minute (2004)features Ashley Olsen's character making a speech at Columbia.
 Night at the Museum (2006)is set in the Museum of Natural History and areas adjoining it.
The Odd Couple (1968) The apartment owned by Oscar Madison, played by Walter Matthau, was at 131 Riverside Drive; the rooftop used was at 190 Riverside.
 Panic Room (2002)takes place on West 94th Street.
 The Panic in Needle Park (1971) and the 1966 novel by James Mills)set in Sherman Square, at Broadway and 70th Street.
 The Pawnbroker (1964)One of the final scenes is at Geraldine Fitzgerald's character's apartment in Lincoln Towers.
 Prime (2005)Uma Thurman gets her nails done at Pinky's on 89th Street.
 Premium Rush (2012) Wilee is seen evading police near the American Museum of Natural History
 Romancing the Stone (1984)Kathleen Turner's character lives on West End Avenue.
 Rosemary's Baby (1968)The Dakota is shown
 Seize the Day (1986)  like the Saul Bellow novel from which it is adapted, is set in an old residential hotel on Broadway in the West 70s; exterior location filming was done there.
 Single White Female (1992)The Ansonia is shown
 Spider-Man (2002)Low Library and College Walk of Columbia University
 Spider-Man 2 (2004)Planetarium at the American Museum of Natural History
 Starting Out in the Evening (2007) and the 1998 novel by Brian Morton
 Take the Money and Run (1969)Virgil and Louise are seen at the fountain in Lincoln Center
Three Men and a Baby (1987) Tom Selleck's character is Peter Mitchell whose apartment is at The Prasada, 50 Central Park West
 Up the Sandbox (1972)In the Columbia University area and in Riverside Park
 Vanilla Sky (2001)car accident at center of film happens in Riverside Park, near 96th Street
 Wall Street (1987)In one of the final scenes, after being punched in Central Park by Michael Douglas for being unloyal, Charlie Sheen walks into the Tavern on the Green where he provides evidence implicating Douglas in federal security fraud. Bud Fox Charlie Sheen's initial small apartment is described as being on the Upper West Side.
 Wall Street: Money Never Sleeps (2010)Gordon Gekko (Michael Douglas) rents a penthouse in a building located in the Upper West Side next to Fordham University with a penthouse facing downtown. In one of the scenes, Jake Moore (Shia LaBeouf) visits him at this penthouse.
 The Warriors (1979)The Warriors emerge from the 72nd street subway station (Baseball Furie's Turf) and run to Riverside Park, where they easily defeat The Baseball Furies. The meeting at the beginning of the film is also conducted in Riverside Park, though it is mislabeled as Van Cortlandt Park.
 West Side Story (1961)takes place in tenements where Lincoln Center is today, around 66th Street
 You've Got Mail (1998)Meg Ryan and Tom Hanks's characters live on the Upper West Side, and various locations were used in the film

Television
In alphabetical order:

 Central Park West - Mid 1990s prime time soap opera about a glossy magazine, its owners and employees.
 Foley Square – Margaret Colin's character Alex Harrigan and Michael Lembeck's character Peter Newman live in an apartment building on the Upper West Side.
 Gossip Girl – The Empire Hotel is Chuck Bass's hotel and is located at 64th Street and Broadway, just north of Columbus Circle.
 The Marvelous Mrs. Maisel - It is mentioned in season 1, episode 1 (and other episodes), that Mrs. Maisel lives in Upper West Side.
 The Night Of – It is mentioned in season 1, episode 1, that the murder which is the primary focus of the storyline occurred at a residence on the Upper West Side.
 The Odd Couple – In one episode (season 4, episode 6), Oscar and Felix give the address of their apartment as West 74th Street and Central Park West (series star Tony Randall actually did live at The San Remo on CPW between West 74th and 75th Streets), although in another episode, the guys' address is given as 1095 Park Avenue, all the way across Manhattan on the Upper East Side. The original Neil Simon stage play from which the subsequent film and various TV adaptions were derived was set on Riverside Drive in the West 80s.
 Only Murders in the Building – The show is set in the Belnord where Steve Martin, Martin Short and Selena Gomez' characters are investigating a murder in said building, "The Arconia". 
 Ryan's Hope – The series' principal family, the Ryans, lived and owned a bar on the Upper West Side.
 Seinfeld – Jerry Seinfeld as the character in the series lived at 129 West 81st Street, though the establishing exterior shots were of a building in Los Angeles; the series used authentic exteriors from locations such as Tom's Restaurant and H&H Bagels. (Jerry Seinfeld himself is an owner of an apartment in The Beresford at 81st Street and Central Park West.)
 Sesame Street - The inspiration for the show's location.
 Sex and the City – The series used many locations, including Gray's Papaya, Zabar's, and Charlotte's (275 CPW) and Miranda's (250 W. 85th) apartments.
 Will & Grace – Will lives in 155 Riverside Drive, Apartment 9C. Jack lives in 155 Riverside Drive, Apartment 9A.

Music
In alphabetical order:

 The Beastie Boys played their first gig in a loft at 100th and Broadway, and recorded some tracks for the EP Polywog Stew there in 1981.
 "Classical Rap" – This parody by Peter Schickele, on his album P. D. Q. Bach: Oedipus Tex & Other Choral Calamities, describes the travails of living on the Upper West Side, as a Yuppie chants hip-hop lyrics to a classical instrumental background.
 "Lazy Sunday" – A parody rap on the late-night sketch comedy show Saturday Night Live (December 2005), performed by Andy Samberg and Chris Parnell about their day going to see The Chronicles of Narnia: The Lion, the Witch and the Wardrobe and getting cupcakes (at Magnolia Bakery, the original of which is in Greenwich Village but there is also one at Columbus Ave at 69th St.). The song's lyrics mention that they see the film at a theater on 68th Street and Broadway. While there is indeed an AMC movie theater on that corner, the video shows them at a ticket booth for an entirely different theater (on 84th and Broadway).
 Lynn Oliver had his recording studio sandwiched next to the New Yorker Bookshop and Benny's on 89th Street and Broadway. Sonny Rollins, Chet Baker, and Stan Getz, among others, could be seen ducking into his alley-like studio to practice and hangout. Oliver's credits are found on a few classic cuts from the '60s.
 "Tom's Diner" – A song by Suzanne Vega focusing on a woman on a rainy morning at Tom's Restaurant at 112th and Broadway.

Books
 The Tale of the Allergist's Wife, 1999 play by Charles Busch
 When You Reach Me, 2009 novel by Rebecca Stead set in the Upper West Side of the author's childhood.
 Rosemary's Baby by Ira Levin
 The Panic in Needle Park by James Mills
  The Ruined House by Reuven (Ruby) Namdar.
 Seize the Day by Saul Bellow
 Starting Out in the Evening by Brian Morton
 The Bonfire of the Vanities by Tom Wolfe

References

Further reading
 Birmingham, Steven, Life at the Dakota: New York's Most Unusual Address, 1996, .
 Goldberg, Jeffrey, "The Decline and Fall of the Upper West Side: How The Poverty Industry Is Ripping Apart A Great New York Neighborhood", New York magazine, April 25, 1994
 Mott, Hopper Striker, The New York of Yesterday: A Descriptive Narrative of Old Bloomingdale, 1908.
 Salwen, Peter, Upper West Side Story 1989, www.upperwestsidestory.net.

External links

 NYCvisit Upper West Side map
 NYSite Upper West Site Guide including the block by block guide
 NYU – Historical Architecture of the Upper West Side

 
Neighborhoods in Manhattan